The 1966 Nobel Prize in Literature was divided equally between Shmuel Yosef Agnon (1888–1970) "for his profoundly characteristic narrative art with motifs from the life of the Jewish people" and Nelly Sachs (1891–1970) "for her outstanding lyrical and dramatic writing, which interprets Israel's destiny with touching strength."

It is one of four occasions (1904, 1917, and 1974) when the Nobel Prize in Literature has been shared between two individuals.

Laureates

Shmuel Yosef Agnon
 
Shmuel Agnon was one of the central figures of modern Hebrew literature. His works deal with the conflict of Jewish tradition and language and the modern world. His first works were published when he was a teenager and he immediately gained a reputation. His breakthrough novel was Hakhnāsat kallāh ("The Bridal Cannopy", 1931). After World War II, under the impact of the holocaust, Agnon wrote Ir Umeloah ("A City in its Fullness", 1973), which is a collection of folktales, legends, and chronicles portraying his birth town, Buczacz.

Nelly Sachs

Nelly Sachs was a German poet and dramatist whose works deal with the dark fate of the Jewish people in the 20th century. She borrows subjects for her poetry from the Jewish beliefs and mysticism, but her authorship is also strongly colored by Nazi persecution of the Jews, with the horrors of the death camps as its ultimate expression. Sachs' poetry combines echoes from the poetry of ancient religious texts with modernist language. Besides poetry, her writings also include a couple of plays. Her best-known collections include In den Wohnungen des Todes ("In the Houses of Death", 1947), Sternverdunkelung ("Eclipse of Stars", 1949), and Flucht und Verwandlung ("Flight and Metamorphosis", 1959).

Deliberations

Nominations
In 1966, the Nobel committee for literature received 99 nominations for 72 individuals including Jean Anouilh, Louis Aragon, W. H. Auden, Samuel Beckett (awarded in 1969), Jorge Luis Borges, Heinrich Böll (awarded in 1972), Alejo Carpentier, René Char, Lawrence Durrell, E. M. Forster, Max Frisch, Robert Graves, Graham Greene, Jorge Guillén, Yasunari Kawabata (awarded in 1968), André Malraux, Harry Martinson (awarded in 1974), Alberto Moravia, Vladimir Nabokov, Pablo Neruda (awarded in 1971), Ezra Pound, Mika Waltari, Tarjei Vesaas and Simon Vestdijk. Ten of the nominees were nominated first-time, among them Pierre-Henri Simon, Witold Gombrowicz, Arnold Wesker, Carlo Emilio Gadda and Günter Grass (awarded in 1999). Three of the nominees were women: Anna Achmatova, Katherine Anne Porter and Nelly Sachs (awarded in 1966. 

The authors Margery Allingham, Hans Christian Branner, Dimitar Dimov, Helga Eng, Svend Fleuron, C. S. Forester, Jean Galtier-Boissière, Mina Loy, Lao She, Kathleen Norris, Frank O'Connor, Frank O'Hara, Brian O'Nolan, Delmore Schwartz, Cordwainer Smith, Daisetsu Teitaro Suzuki, Yórgos Theotokás, Henry Treece, and Marja-Liisa Vartio died in 1966 without having been nominated for the prize. Russian poet Anna Akhmatova died months before the announcement.

Prize decision
The Nobel committee, a working group within the Swedish Academy, proposed that the 1966 Nobel Prize in Literature should be awarded to the Japanese writer Yasunari Kawabata, but, unconventionally, the 18 members of the Academy did not follow the recommendation and voted for a prize to Agnon and Sachs. A shared prize to the Latin American writers Jorge Luis Borges and Miguel Angel Asturias, and to Nelly Sachs and Paul Celan were proposed.

Award ceremony
In his award ceremony speech on 10 December 1966 Anders Österling of the Swedish Academy said:

References

External links
Award Ceremony speech nobelprize.org
List of all nominations nobelprize.org

1966
1966 in literature